Major General Russell Gurney CB (1890–1947) was a British Army officer who served in both  World War I and World War II.

Military career
Born in 1890, Russell Gurney was the son of a clergyman and was educated at Clifton College. He volunteered for the British Army during World War I and was commissioned into the Northamptonshire Regiment in 1915, with which he saw service in France and, later, Italy.

He remained in the army during the interwar period and attended the  Staff College, Camberley from 1921 to 1922. He was married in 1928 and, in 1935, wrote a history of his regiment, before transferring to the Suffolk Regiment and assuming command of the 1st Battalion of his new regiment in 1937. The following year he became Commandant of the Small Arms School at Netheravon, Wiltshire.

He served in this capacity until early October 1939, a few weeks after the outbreak of World War II, when he assumed command of the  17th Infantry Brigade. He was not there long, however, as he was declared medically unfit until, in 1940, he was posted to the War Office as a General Staff Officer Grade 1 (GSO1). He was to remain in this post until the following year, when he was made Senior Umpire with Home Forces, before again returning to the War Office, this time serving on Special Employment. 23 February 1943 saw him promoted to the acting rank of major general as he was made Director of Personnel Services at the War Office. He held this position until 1947, the year he retired from the army, after 33 years of service, and later died, from a short illness, in his home in Devon, at the age of just 57.

References

Bibliography

External links
Generals of World War II

1890 births
1947 deaths
British Army generals of World War II
British Army personnel of World War I
People educated at Clifton College
Graduates of the Staff College, Camberley
Northamptonshire Regiment officers
Suffolk Regiment officers
War Office personnel in World War II
Companions of the Order of the Bath
British Army major generals